Faleāsao is a village in American Samoa. It is located in Manu'a District, on the northern shore of Ta'ū Island. It is divided into two subvillages the eastern side being called Si'ua'i while the western half being called Tufulele (Tufu). The high chief is the Aso'au title currently in array for there is no known heir to the title.

Faleasao lies on Faleasao Bay on the extreme northwest coast of Ta'ū Island. The narrow bay is closed off towards the north by a 330-500-ft. high bluff and protected towards the south by a low cliffy promontory known as Malinu'u; a wide border reef all but fills the narrow bay.

It is home to a white sandy beach. Just offshore there is much coral just below the surface which is exposed at low tide. It is bordered by the Tunoa Ridge and lies just south of Si'ulagi Point. There is a nearby hiking trail on Agricultural Road leading to Tunoa Ridge. Barn owls and fruit bats are common by Tunoa Ridge during mornings.

The power plant and school were severely damaged by Cyclone Olaf in 2005.

It has been called the capital of the Manu'a Islands.

Demographics

References

Villages in American Samoa